Niki Belucci (born Nikolett Pósán, on 10 March 1983) is a Hungarian DJ and former pornographic actress.

Born in Budapest, at young age, Belucci practiced gymnastics and won several medals in youth competitions, before stopping at the age of 15 years because of a serious injury. She later got a diploma in hotel management school and, at the age of 19 years, started working first as a nude model and later as a pornographic actress. Belucci eventually left the porn industry shortly after getting married. During her adult career, she starred in about thirty films.

Belucci started her career as a DJ in 2003, collaborating with two Hungarian DJs, Spigiboy and DJ Mozsó, and embarking on a tour called the "Orgasmic Tour" as a tribute to her adult career. During her musical career, she made a worldwide tour and released a mix-album and several singles. In 2010, she was the resident DJ of the Amnesia nightclub in Ibiza.

Awards and nominations
 2005 AVN Award nominee – Female Foreign Performer of the Year
 2005 AVN Award nominee – Best Sex Scene in a Foreign-Shot Production (The Voyeur 26) with Tiffany Diamond & Nick Lang

References

External links

  
 
 
 
 

1983 births
Women DJs
Hungarian DJs
Hungarian pornographic film actresses
Living people
Musicians from Budapest
Actresses from Budapest
21st-century women musicians